The Wellcome Photography Prize is an annual photography competition organised by the Wellcome Trust. It was established in 1997 as the Wellcome Image Awards, for science image making. It was renamed in a revamp and expansion in 2018.

Winners

Wellcome Image Awards 2016
20 winners

Wellcome Image Awards 2017
22 winners

Wellcome Photography Prize 2019

Overall winner: Erin Lefevre 
Social Perspectives: Erin Lefevre
Outbreaks: David Chancellor
Medicine in Focus: Dmitry Kostyukov
Hidden Worlds: Simone Cerio

Wellcome Photography Prize 2020

Overall winner: Arseniy Neskhodimov
Mental Health (series): Arseniy Neskhodimov
The Social Perspectives: Marijn Fidder
Hidden Worlds: Jenevieve Aken
Medicine in Focus: Julia Gunther and Sophia Mohammed
Mental Health (single image): Benji Reid

Wellcome Photography Prize 2021

Overall single image winner (a £10,000 prize): Jameisha Prescod
Overall series winner (a £10,000 prize): Yoppy Pieter
Managing Mental Health
Single image: Jameisha Prescod
Series: Morteza Niknahad
Fighting Infections
Single image: Aly Song
Series: Yoppy Pieter
Health in a Heating World
Single image: Zakir Hossain Chowdhury
Series: Hashem Shakeri

See also
List of photography awards

References

External links

Photography awards
Photography in the United Kingdom
Awards established in 1997
Annual events in the United Kingdom
1997 establishments in the United Kingdom
Wellcome Trust